Zee Cine Awards 2011 was held in India

Hosts
Akshay Kumar
Sajid Khan
Neha Dhupia

Performances
Priyanka Chopra Dance and Presentation of Best Film Nominees
Arjun Rampal
 Kids from Dance India Dance in honour of Super Jodi Rishi Kapoor & Neetu Singh
Aishwarya Rai
Deepika Padukone
Shahrukh Khan Dance on Song Noor-E-Khuda and Honouring Hritik Roshan & Suzanne (Khan) Roshan

Awards
The official Winners are listed Below.

Viewer's choice

Jury's choice

Technical Awards

See also
 Zee Cine Awards
 Bollywood
 Cinema of India

References

External links 
Zee Cine Awards 

Zee Cine Awards
2011 Indian film awards
2011 in Singapore

de:Zee Cine Award/Bester Liedtext